Pepijn is the Dutch form of the masculine given name Pippin. Before the 1960s the name was rarely used in the Netherlands, but it has become quite popular since the turn of the century. As a patronymic surname it appears to be extinct in Belgium and the Netherlands. People with the name include:

Given name
Pepijn Aardewijn (born 1970), Dutch rower
Pepijn Bijsterbosch (born 1989), Dutch motorcycle racer
Pepijn Caudron (born 1975), Belgian composer and producer known as "Kreng"
Pepijn van Erp (born 1972), Dutch mathematician and skeptic
Pepijn Lijnders (born 1983), Dutch football manager
Pepijn van den Nieuwendijk (born 1970), Dutch painter and ceramist
Don Pepijn Schipper (born 1980), Dutch DJ known as "Don Diablo"
Pepijn Veerman (born 1992), Dutch footballer

Surname
Katharina Pepijn (1619–1688), Flemish painter
Marten Pepijn (1575–1643), Flemish painter

References

Dutch masculine given names